The Mahoraga (Sanskrit: महोरग) are a race of deities in Hinduism, Buddhism, and Jainism. Like the nāga, they are often depicted as anthropomorphic beings with serpentine bodies from the waist down. However, their appearance can differ depending on artistic tradition, sometimes having serpent heads with humanoid bodies.

Buddhism

The Mahoraga are one of the eight classes of deities (aṣṭasenā) that are said to protect the Dharma. They are described as huge subterranean serpents who lie on their sides and rotate the earth, which occasionally causes earthquakes. 

Like the kinnara, the mahoraga are also associated with music. They are understood as being associated with large serpents such as pythons, while the nāgas are more closely related to the cobra.

According to the Śariputraparipṛcchā Sūtra (T. 1465), one is reborn as a mahoraga as a result of practicing generosity and upholding the Dharma, while being inclined toward anger.

References

Buddhist deities
Buddhist legendary creatures
Mythological monsters
Legendary serpents
Dragons
Non-human races in Hindu mythology
Hindu legendary creatures
Snake gods